Parachan may refer to:
 Parachan, alternate name of Barajin, Qazvin
 Parachan, Alborz
 Parachan, Qazvin